Wanweiroy Kharlukhi is an Indian politician. He is a Member of Parliament, representing Meghalaya in the Rajya Sabha the upper house of India's Parliament as a member of the National People's Party.

References

Rajya Sabha members from Meghalaya
National People's Party (India) politicians
Living people
Year of birth missing (living people)